The Indian School Salalah is an Indian-run, self-financing, co-educational institution, primarily established to meet the academic needs  of children of Indian expatriates working in the Sultanate of Oman in the Persian Gulf. The school also admits children of other nationalities. The school is located in the Dahariz area, of Salalah town, in the southern governorate of Dhofar.

Affiliation, curriculum and competitive examinations 

The school is affiliated to the Central Board of Secondary Education (CBSE),  New Delhi,  India.
It follows textbooks prescribed by the NCERT, New Delhi.

The school is structured into Kindergarten (LKG & UKG), Lower Primary (Grade 1 & 2), Primary (Grade 3 & 4), Middle School (Grade 5-8) and High School (Grade 9-12).

English is the primary medium of education, and students are required to learn Hindi as a second language from class 1 to 8. Arabic, French or  Malayalam can substitute for Hindi in classes 9 and 10. A third language, Arabic, Malayalam, French or Hindi is a requirement in classes 5 to 8.

The school conducts All-India public exams regulated by the CBSE for classes 10 & 12. The class 9 final exam is conducted as a public exam by the regional Gulf board (an association of Gulf Indian schools).

The institution also holds the Maths olympiad conducted by the Indian National Mathematics Olympiad every February. All top scorers are awarded certificates.
Olympiads for Maths, Science and Computer Science are conducted by the New South Wales University, Australia for classes 9th & 12th.

ISS holds the ASSET examination every year. This assessment is conducted by Educational Initiatives, India. Students of ISS also write the NGSE examination conducted by National Genius Search Foundation (NGSF), India and the NTSC Competitive Assessment.
Students of class 5 to 10 also appear for the Shastra Prathibha contest conducted by Science India Forum Muscat (SIF Muscat) in association with Vijnana  Bharathi.

ISS has taken part in national contests including Jhankaar Spectrum hosted by ISM, Times of Oman Quiz, Science Fiesta conducted by SIF Muscat, CBSE Oman Cluster Athletic Meet conducted by the Indian schools of Oman in association with CBSE board and Indian Embassy in Oman, Sports Fiesta, Ambassador's Ambedkar Essay Contest, SAI Essay and Poster Contest, Ambassador's Polemic Debate Challenge and National Quiz Pot.

History 
The 1970s and the 1980s witnessed rapid industrial growth in Oman as a result of the oil boom. This required extra employment and the need was met mainly by Indian workers on work permit visas. This community could not bring their children with them from India as there were no Indian academic facilities available then. The Indians in Salalah organised under an Indian club and submitted a petition to the Sultan of Oman, Qaboos bin Said al Said. He granted permission to construct a small building adjacent to the Indian Club at Haffa area in 1981.

The school started with classes only until class 4 but increased it by one every year.

In 1984, the school, being close to the Sultan's Al Hosn Palace was asked to relocate to Dahariz, a new area being developed for educational institutions. The school relocated to its new campus in September 1985.

The school was brought under the purview of the Ministry of private education, Oman in 1988. The ministry asked the Indian Embassy Oman to disband the old Indian Club sub committee that was managing the school until then and form an independent one consisting of prominent Indian expatriates in Salalah.

The school conducted its first class 10th CBSE public exam in 1988 and the class 12th public exam in 1994. It celebrated its Silver jubilee in February 2006.

Facilities 

The present campus at Dahariz has 15,297 sq m of area with 6,735 sq m built up.  The school maintains a turfed playground (the largest lawn amongst all Gulf Schools) and a kindergarten playpen.

The main building is in the form of a rectangle with an open air quadrangle in the centre. All rooms are airconditioned to bear the extreme summer heat. The quadrangle is used for the morning general assembly and miscellaneous functions at night. The building also houses an indoor auditorium, five broadband connected computer labs, four science labs (chemistry lab, Biology lab, Physics lab and Junior science lab), a maths lab, staff rooms, two Music rooms, a computerised general library, a canteen for teachers, a primary library, 20 Smart Board classes with Kyan multimedia, a first-aid room and an audio-visual room with multimedia facilities. A new block accommodates classes LKG to grade 2.

The school has facilities for teaching non-scholastic subjects like arts, craft, music (vocal and instrumental), computer, CCA, environment and physical education.

The school has about 150 classrooms to accommodate 4,000 students, with 100 plus teaching and more than 25 non-teaching staff.
The new block was added to the existing building in August 2010.

Activities

Houses
The school follows a "house" grouping system for conducting co-curricular activities. Each student is assigned to a house at the beginning of his/her first academic year and represents it when participating in any individual or team competition till he/she leaves the school. Victories award points to one's house. All points are added up at the end of the year and the top two houses are awarded trophies on annual day.

Blue, green, red and yellow are the four house colours used, represented by coloured stripes on the uniform neck-ties of boys or by colored ribbons worn by girls. Teachers are appointed as house masters and mistresses to govern the houses. The Office Bearers for every house are elected by the students and administer their oath at the Investiture Ceremony every July.

Interhouse co-curricular activities 
Inter-house competitions are held throughout the academic year, consisting of :-
 On-stage Cultural events— Debates (Turncoat and Parliamentary), Elocution ( English and Hindi), Extempore ( English), Poetry Recitation (English), Singing ( Group, Western Vocal, Indian Light Vocal, Indian Classical Vocal), Instrumental Music, Dumb-charade, Drama (Skits), Spelling Bee, Indian Folk Dance Multimedia Presentation, and Quizzes
 Off-stage Cultural events-  Art (Drawing, Painting), Calligraphy, Origami, Craft, Creative Writing, Digital Painting,
Athletics— Sprints (50m, 80m, 100m, 200m, 400m, 1500m etc.), Jumps (Long Jump, High Jump, Triple Jump) Throws (Shot put, Javelin-throw, Discus-throw), Relays
March Pasts
Team Sports— Football (Soccer), Cricket, Baseball, Throwball, Basketball, Kho-Kho
Indoor Sports- Badminton and Chess

Clubs
Eco-Club
Astronomy Club
Maths Club
Birdwatching Club
Photography Club
Quiz Club
IT Club
Science Club
Gavel Club

Duke of Edinburgh Award Scheme 
The school takes part in the Duke of Edinburgh Award Scheme also known as International Award For Young People (IAYP) for students from class 9 onwards. This is a scheme now spread throughout the Commonwealth and followed in India and Indian-based schools as the 'International Award For Young People'.

Scouts and Guides 
The school also conducts the Scouts and Guides program in association with The Bharat Scouts and Guides from classes 5th to 9th. This program is an extra- curricular education consisting of outdoor physical activities like camping, hiking, knot tying, excursions and social services. The Scouts uniform is a deep grey shirt, navy blue pants with Scouts hat, neck kerchief and whistle while the Guides have a deep blue kurta and salvar, with neck kerchief and a campaign hat. Children from class 3 and 4 are enrolled as Cubs/ Bulbuls as a training before they enter the real senior Scouts and Guides program.

Celebrations and holidays 
The teachers are given a day off on Teacher's day held on 5 September, the class 11 and 12 students are allowed to impersonate members of the faculty and teach a few classes.

The school celebrates all Indian holidays with cultural festivals that are well-attended by the Salalah populace. Most of the religious and cultural festivals of India are also celebrated. The school remains closed on Omani National Holidays. The Annual Sports Meet is held usually in November and the School Annual Day in January.
The Annual Day is celebrated on a grand scale with skits, dances, choirs etc. Students are then conferred with prizes and certificates for outstanding achievements in academics and co-curricular activities for that academic year.
The school used to have regular exhibitions until 2006 which was restarted again with a large-scale exhibition in 2014. The school also conducts Carnivals.

International achievements 
 Project Green Oman,  a project launched to promote Eco-friendliness in Oman by  two students of Indian School Salalah, won the World Environment Day Global School Contest 2012 conducted by the United Nations Conference on Sustainable Development. On June 5, 2014, International Energy Globe Award (dubbed as Nature's Nobel Prize) declared Hridith Sudev, one of the founders of Project GreenOman as their 2014 Energy Globe Laureate for his 'consistent Environmental stewardship'., He was also awarded the International Young EcoHero Award in 2017.
 Two of Indian School Salalah students, along with Social Science Department HOD were selected to attend Indian Republic Day Parade 2015 in New Delhi, India as part of Asianet News Proud to Be Indian (PTBI) in January 2015. Other schools from Oman which were selected for student representation in PTBI were Indian School Darsait, Indian School Jalan and Indian School Ibra.

Notable alumni

 Sneha Ullal - Bollywood actress

See also 
Salalah
Indian Diaspora

References

External links 
 https://web.archive.org/web/20090323084430/http://www.indemb-oman.org/Indian%20Schools.asp
 http://wikimapia.org/#lat=17.0325152&lon=54.1589928&z=17&l=0&m=b&v=8&ifr=1
 http://www.merinews.com/article/reverse-brain-drain-blessing-in-disguise-for-india-ii/15777123.shtml
 https://www.panoramio.com/photo/9722657

Buildings and structures in Salalah
Indian international schools in Oman
Educational institutions established in 1981
1981 establishments in Oman